Trilochana is a genus of moths in the family Sesiidae.

Species
Trilochana scolioides Moore, 1879
Trilochana caseariae Yang & Wang, 1989
Trilochana chalciptera Hampson, 1919
Trilochana illustris Kallies & Arita, 1998
Trilochana insignis (Butler, 1885)
Trilochana nagaii Arita & Kallies, 2003
Trilochana oberthueri Le Cerf, 1917
Trilochana smaragdina Diakonoff, 1954
Trilochana triscoliopsis Rothschild, 1925

References

Sesiidae